Byhalia  , is a town in Marshall County, Mississippi, United States. The population was 1,302 as of the 2010 census.

History
Byhalia was founded in the 1830s and named after Byhalia Creek, which flows past the site.

Geography

Demographics

2020 census

As of the 2020 United States Census, there were 1,339 people, 637 households, and 409 families residing in the town.

2010 census
As of the 2010 United States Census, there were 1,302 people living in the town. 51.4% were White, 44.9% Black or African American, 1.7% of some other race and 2.1% of two or more races. 4.0% were Hispanic or Latino (of any race).

2000 census
The following demographic information is based on 2000 Census information; however, the population of Byhalia has significantly increased in recent years due to immigration and a 2005 annexation of adjacent area. The population in 2007 was estimated at over 2,000.

As of the census of 2000, there were 706 people, 275 households, and 188 families living in the town. The racial makeup of the town was 60.76% White, 35.69% African American, 0.14% Native American, 3.12% from other races, and 0.28% from two or more races. Hispanic or Latino of any race were 3.12% of the population.

There were 275 households, out of which 30.9% had children under the age of 18 living with them, 42.5% were married couples living together, 22.2% had a female householder with no husband present, and 31.6% were non-families. 27.6% of all households were made up of individuals, and 10.2% had someone living alone who was 65 years of age or older. The average household size was 2.57 and the average family size was 3.13.

In the town, the population was spread out, with 26.5% under the age of 18, 10.8% from 18 to 24, 25.8% from 25 to 44, 22.2% from 45 to 64, and 14.7% who were 65 years of age or older. The median age was 36 years. For every 100 females, there were 84.8 males. For every 100 females age 18 and over, there were 79.0 males.

The median income for a household in the town was $26,618, and the median income for a family was $35,313. Males had a median income of $34,375 versus $19,219 for females. The per capita income for the town was $15,156. About 25.0% of families and 26.4% of the population were below the poverty line, including 31.2% of those under age 18 and 39.2% of those age 65 or over.

Education
The town of Byhalia is served by the Marshall County School District, one of the districts being supported by the Mississippi Teacher Corps.

Notable People
The soul singer Jan Bradley was born in Byhalia in 1943.
 The Nobel Prize-winning author William Faulkner died in Byhalia in 1962.
 Track and Field Olympian (Tokyo 20 heptathlon) Erica Bougard

In Popular Culture
The original field recording of "Sea Lion Woman", sung by Katherine and Christine Shipp, was recorded in Byhalia by Herbert Halpert on May 13, 1939.
The play Byhalia, Mississippi by Evan Linder premiered in January 2016.

References

Towns in Marshall County, Mississippi
Towns in Mississippi
Memphis metropolitan area
Mississippi placenames of Native American origin